Jacob Tanner Diekman (born January 21, 1987), is an American professional baseball pitcher for the Chicago White Sox of Major League Baseball (MLB). He has previously played in MLB for the Philadelphia Phillies, Texas Rangers, Arizona Diamondbacks, Kansas City Royals, Oakland Athletics, and Boston Red Sox.

With the Phillies, Diekman began as a starting pitcher and progressed through a few levels of the Phillies' farm system in his first two years in that role, before adjusting his mechanics and lowering his arm slot to throw sidearm out of the bullpen, as a relief pitcher. The adjustment worked and helped him move through the remaining levels of the Phillies' farm system. In 2012, Diekman made his major league debut. Over the next two seasons, he split time between the major league Phillies and their Triple-A (AAA) affiliate, the Lehigh Valley IronPigs, though while he was with the major league team, he was considered one of the "lone bright spots" in both 2012 and 2013. Diekman throws a fastball in the upper-90s (mph), a slider, and an occasional changeup; his fastball is among the fastest of any left-handed reliever in the major leagues.

Early career
Diekman was born to Paul and Billie Diekman, in 1987. He has one brother, Brian. The Diekmans lived in Wymore, Nebraska, where Jake attended Southern High School. His alma mater was too small to field a baseball team, so he instead focused on golf. Eventually, Diekman joined an American Legion baseball team, playing in the summer with other players from Wymore and several surrounding towns, which he called "the best experience of my life ... so much fun." Concurrently, Diekman worked full-time at a lawn mower factory, to earn money to pursue a post-secondary education.

After graduating from high school, Diekman enrolled at Doane College, pitching one season for the school's ball team. He then transferred to Cloud County Community College, in Kansas. He received an offer for a full scholarship to be a Nebraska Cornhusker, which he would have accepted, had the Phillies not drafted him in the 2007 Major League Baseball Draft's 30th round.

Professional career

Philadelphia Phillies

Between 2007 and 2010, he pitched in the lower levels of the Philadelphia Phillies' Minor League system initially as a starter, and subsequently as a reliever. Although he initially saw success in 2007, posting a 2.72 ERA in 10 starts with GCL Phillies and Williamsport Crosscutters, he struggled in 2008, posting an ERA of 5.09 in 27 starts, split between Williamsport and the Lakewood BlueClaws. At the conclusion of both 2008 and 2009, he pitched in the Florida Instructional League to continue honing his skills on the mound.

He converted from a starting pitcher to a reliever in 2009, along with several other Phillies pitching prospects. Around that time, he also, at the suggestion of the same minor league pitching coaches who converted him to relief, lowered his release point to his current low angle. Success did not manifest itself immediately, as he still posted a 4.04 ERA in 2009, his first season in relief, but in 2010, he cut his ERA to 2.91 while splitting time between Lakewood and the Clearwater Threshers, the Phillies High-A affiliate. At the end of the 2010 season, he played for the Mesa Solar Sox in the Arizona Fall League. He spent the 2011 season with the Double-A Reading Phillies, accruing a 0–1 record and a 3.05 ERA and 3 saves in 53 games. Thereafter, the Phillies added him to their 40-man roster to protect him from the Rule 5 draft.

After receiving praise from Phillies' pitching coach Rich Dubee for his performance in spring training, Diekman opened the 2012 season with the Triple-A (AAA) Lehigh Valley IronPigs. With Lehigh Valley, he posted a 1–0 record and a 0.59 ERA with 5 saves in 13 games in the season's first month.  He was added to the Phillies' 25-man Major League roster on May 11, and four days later recorded a win against the Houston Astros in his MLB debut. He finished the year an established lefty specialist, and had a 3.95 ERA, though walked 6.6 batters per 9 innings, and was erratic in his control.

Entering 2013, Diekman was expected to be a key part of the Phillies bullpen after his success in 2012, however he did not break camp with the big league club, beginning the season in AAA. In AAA, he struggled, which delayed his arrival to the major league team until June. While with the big league club, he continued his dominance of left-handed hitters, however was not as good against right-handed hitters (a 150-point differential in opponent batting average and over 300 point differential in On-base plus slugging (OPS)). Diekman improved his control, which made him a presumptive member of the 2014 bullpen, as he was one of 2013's "lone bright spots" for the otherwise dismal Phillies' bullpen. Ultimately, he did make the Phillies' opening day roster as a member of the bullpen.

Early in the season, Diekman emerged as a reliable reliever in the Phillies' bullpen, and was used extensively by manager Ryne Sandberg. As the season progressed, Diekman was more successful against left-handed hitters than right-handed hitters, but was used against both in a variety of situations. On September 1, 2014, Diekman was one of four pitchers who combined for a no-hitter in the Phillies' 7–0 win over the Atlanta Braves in Turner Field. By the end of the season, the Phillies had one of the best bullpens in the league, and it consisted predominantly of young players such as Diekman. There was excitement from both Phillies' personnel and writers that the bullpen could remain solid for a long time because of young pitchers such as Diekman, Ken Giles, and Justin De Fratus. Moreover, Diekman and Giles had potential as closers should the Phillies trade Jonathan Papelbon. Overall, Diekman emerged as a name to be mentioned among the "elite" relievers of the National League, but was overused against right-handed batters, which hurt his statistics.

Texas Rangers
On July 31, 2015, Diekman was traded to the Texas Rangers along with Cole Hamels in exchange for Matt Harrison, Nick Williams, Jorge Alfaro, Jake Thompson, Alec Asher, and Jerad Eickhoff. He became an important bullpen piece in the Rangers' run to the playoffs in 2016. Diekman and the Rangers agreed to a one-year deal worth $1.225 million on January 29, 2016, and avoided arbitration. Diekman finished the 2016 season with a 4–2 record, 4 saves and a 3.40 ERA in 66 appearances.  On January 25, 2017, Diekman underwent surgery for chronic ulcerative colitis. He only made 11 appearances towards the end of the season. In 2018, fully healthy, Diekman posted an ERA of 3.69 in 47 games. He struck out 48 batters in 39 innings.

Arizona Diamondbacks
On July 31, 2018, Diekman was traded to the Arizona Diamondbacks for Wei-Chieh Huang and Joshua Javier. The trade took place while the Diamondbacks and Rangers were facing off in a two-game series in Arizona. Diekman struggled after being acquired by Arizona, posting an ERA of 7.53 in 24 appearances. Diekman became a free agent following the 2018 season.

Kansas City Royals
On February 13, 2019, Diekman signed a one-year contract with a mutual option for 2020 with the Kansas City Royals. The deal was worth a reported $2.75 million guaranteed, plus performance incentives. In 48 relief appearances with the 2019 Royals, Diekman accrued a 4.75 ERA and an 0–6 record while striking out 63 batters in  innings.

Oakland Athletics
On July 27, 2019, the Royals traded Diekman to the Oakland Athletics for Ismael Aquino and Dairon Blanco. On September 6, Diekman pitched in a suspended game between the Athletics and Detroit Tigers that originally started on May 19, allowing a double in a scoreless inning. This appearance was recorded on the original game date of May 19, when Diekman threw an inning of relief for the Royals against the Los Angeles Angels. Diekman thus accomplished the rare feat of having pitched for two different teams on the same day, statistically. For the 2019 season, he tied for the major league lead in holds (31). In 28 games for the A's, Diekman struck out 21 in  innings.

Diekman became a free agent following the 2019 season after the Athletics declined his contract option. On December 3, 2019, Diekman re-signed with Oakland on a two-year contract. In the 2020 shortened season, Diekman only allowed 2 runs in  innings.

Boston Red Sox
On March 16, 2022, Diekman signed a two-year contract with a club option for 2024 with the Boston Red Sox. In 44 relief appearances through the end of July, he compiled a 5–1 record and a 4.23 ERA while striking out 51 batters in  innings.

Chicago White Sox
On August 1, 2022, Diekman was traded to the Chicago White Sox for catcher Reese McGuire and a player to be named later or cash considerations. In 26 relief appearances through the end of the season, Diekman compiled an 0–3 record with a 6.52 ERA while striking out 28 batters in  innings.

Pitching style

A lefty specialist, Diekman throws a fastball in the mid-90s, a slider at 78–81, and an occasional changeup to right-handed hitters. His fastball is among the fastest of left-handed relievers in the major leagues. Like most left-handed pitchers, particularly those who throw out of an arm angle similar to Diekman's, he is tough on left-handed hitters. In 2013, he held lefties to just a .368 OPS, though allowed a .765 OPS to right-handed hitters. Despite suggestions he remain a lefty specialist, he emerged in 2014 as a favorite middle reliever for manager Ryne Sandberg against both righties and lefties. In 2020, Diekman credited Rob Friedman with helping improve his slider grip through Twitter, increasing the horizontal break on his slider substantially.

Personal life
Diekman's mother died at age 57 just months before the Phillies drafted him. Diekman describes his father as his "best friend", and one who has helped him cope with his mother's death. His mother, Billie, was Diekman's "biggest fan" and had to order her husband, Paul, to stop pacing and watch Diekman pitch. Diekman has sought therapy to cope with the loss of his mother, and meditates and thinks about her during "The Star-Spangled Banner" prior to each game.  Away from baseball, Diekman holds an associate's degree in business administration from Cloud County Community College. He enjoys listening to music, working out, playing golf, and long walks on the beach. He resides in Beatrice, Nebraska, during the offseason. Because of his struggles with ulcerative colitis, he started a non-profit association called Gut It Out to benefit others who struggle with the disease.

Jake is married to the former Amanda Soltero, the 2014 Miss Nebraska USA and former TV reporter for 10/11 News in Lincoln, Nebraska.  They have one daughter.  Jake's father-in-law Saul Soltero was a pitcher in the San Diego Padres organization, posting a 2.58 ERA and .643 winning percentage in 159 games over a 6-year span.  He reached as high as the Double-A level before an elbow injury resulting in Tommy John surgery sidetracked his career.

References

External links

Gut It Out Foundation

1987 births
Living people
People from Gage County, Nebraska
Baseball players from Nebraska
Major League Baseball pitchers
Philadelphia Phillies players
Texas Rangers players
Arizona Diamondbacks players
Kansas City Royals players
Oakland Athletics players
Boston Red Sox players
Chicago White Sox players
Florida Complex League Phillies players
Williamsport Crosscutters players
Lakewood BlueClaws players
Clearwater Threshers players
Mesa Solar Sox players
Reading Phillies players
Scottsdale Scorpions players
Lehigh Valley IronPigs players
People from Beatrice, Nebraska